Peru is a source, transit, and destination country for men, women, and children subjected to trafficking in persons, specifically forced labor and forced prostitution. Several thousand persons are estimated to be subjected to conditions of forced labor within Peru, mainly in mining, logging, agriculture, brick making, and domestic servitude. Many trafficking victims are women and girls from impoverished rural regions of the Amazon, recruited and coerced into prostitution in urban nightclubs, bars, and brothels, often through false employment offers or promises of education. Indigenous persons are particularly vulnerable to debt bondage. Forced child labor remains a problem, particularly in informal gold mines, cocaine production, and transportation. There were reports the terrorist group Sendero Luminoso, or Shining Path, recruited children as soldiers and drug mules. To a lesser extent, Peruvians are subjected to forced prostitution in Ecuador, Spain, Italy, Japan, and the United States, and forced labor in Argentina, Chile, and Brazil. Peru also is a destination country for some Ecuadorian and Bolivian females in forced prostitution, and some Bolivian citizens in conditions of forced labor. Child sex tourism is present in Iquitos, Madre de Dios, and Cuzco. Traffickers reportedly operate with impunity in certain regions where there is little or no government presence.

The Government of Peru does not fully comply with the minimum standards for the elimination of Trafficking; however, it is making significant efforts to do so. Last year, the government increased law enforcement efforts against trafficking crimes and maintained public awareness initiatives. However, the government failed to provide adequate victim services and made insufficient efforts to address the high incidence of labor trafficking in the country. U.S. State Department's Office to Monitor and Combat Trafficking in Persons placed the country in "Tier 2"  in 2017.

Prosecution
The Government of Peru improved efforts to combat human trafficking through law enforcement last year. Law 28950 prohibits all forms of trafficking in persons, prescribing penalties of eight to 25 years’ imprisonment depending on the circumstances. These penalties are sufficiently stringent and commensurate with those prescribed for other serious crimes, such as rape. During the reporting period, police investigated 137 trafficking cases; of these, 34 involved forced labor and 103 involved sex trafficking, with a total of 185 reported victims. Authorities brought forth 78 trafficking cases to the judiciary and secured the convictions of nine sex trafficking offenders, who received sentences ranging from three to 30 years’ imprisonment, in addition to fines. In comparison, Peruvian authorities prosecuted 54 cases and convicted five sex trafficking offenders the previous year. However, there were very few prosecutions and no convictions reported for forced labor offenses, despite an estimated high incidence of forced labor in the country. The government’s dedicated anti-trafficking police unit consisted of approximately 30 officers.

Police maintained and expanded the use of an electronic case tracking system for human trafficking investigations, although this system did not track judicial activity, such as prosecutions and convictions. Corruption among low-level officials enabled trafficking in certain instances, and individual police officers tolerated the operation of unlicensed brothels and the prostitution of children. No investigations or allegations of official complicity with trafficking activity were reported last year. The government provided training on human trafficking to law enforcement officials, immigration officials, diplomats, and legal officials, among others. The government collaborated with foreign governments on anti-trafficking initiatives and investigations.

Protection
The government provided limited assistance to trafficking victims last year. The government did not employ a formal mechanism for identifying trafficking victims among vulnerable populations, such as adult women in prostitution. While the government had no formal process for referring trafficking victims for treatment, authorities could refer child victims of trafficking to government-operated children’s homes for basic shelter and care, two of which provide specialized care to victims of commercial sexual exploitation. Similarly, the government operated general shelters for adult female victims of abuse, which some trafficking victims accessed during the reporting period.

Non-governmental organizations (NGOs) provided care to sexually exploited women; however, specialized services and shelter for trafficking victims remained largely unavailable. The government did not provide financial assistance to anti-trafficking NGOs, though it provided in-kind support; adequate victim services remained unavailable in many parts of the country.

Foreign victims had access to the same services as Peruvian victims. Last year, Peruvian authorities identified 185 trafficking victims, 159 women and 26 menthough the number of victims in the country is thought to be much higherand provided 19 of these victims with legal, social, and psychological services. Some trafficking victims were not advised of their rights or provided with medical treatment, and some police officers released them without recognizing their victim status or referring them to shelters; some of these victims ended up returning to brothels in search of shelter and food.

Lack of victim participation in the investigation or prosecution of traffickers remained a problem, in addition to the lack of a witness protection program. Some victims may not have pursued legal redress because they could not afford legal representation. The government did not penalize victims for unlawful acts committed as a direct result of being trafficked. Trafficking victims were eligible for temporary and permanent residency status under Peruvian refugee law, and at least 11 victims were granted such permanent residency. During the year, authorities assisted foreign trafficking victims with voluntary repatriation. Many of the country’s 412 labor inspectors have received training on forced labor; in 2009, the government created an elite team of five inspectors to address forced labor in the Amazon, but the team found their budget was insufficient to complete the mission.

Prevention
The Government of Peru sustained anti-trafficking prevention efforts. The government maintained an anti-trafficking campaign and operated and promoted a hotline for trafficking-related crimes and information, which received 44 reports of trafficking in 2009. The government continued to air anti-trafficking videos in transportation hubs, warning travelers of the legal consequences of engaging in trafficking activity or consuming services from trafficked persons. Although some areas of the country are known child sex tourism destinations and Peruvian laws prohibit this practice, there were no reported convictions of child sex tourists. The government trained 710 government officials and tourism service providers about child sex tourism, conducted a public awareness campaign on the issue, and reached out to the tourism industry to raise awareness about child sex tourism; to date, 60 businesses have signed code of conduct agreements nationwide. No efforts to reduce demand for commercial sex acts or forced labor were reported. The government provided Peruvian peacekeepers with human rights training prior to deployment.
In October 2011, almost 300 women and young girls were rescued from sexual exploitation in a raid in an Amazonian region of Peru known as a gold mining hub.

See also
Human rights in Peru
 Child camel jockey
 Child labour
 Child laundering
 Comfort woman
 Commercial sexual exploitation of children
 Debt bondage
 Exploitation
 Sexual exploitation
 Forced labour
 Forced prostitution
 Illegal immigration
 ILO
 Kidnapping
 Military use of children
 People smuggling
 Serious and Organised Crime Group
 Sharecropping
 South East Asia Court of Women on HIV and Human Trafficking
 Trafficking of children

References

Peru
Peru
Human rights abuses in Peru
Crime in Peru by type